Itanhomi is a municipality in the state of Minas Gerais in the Southeast region of Brazil.

History
Legend spoke about the existence of an Indian chief named Queiroga. Queiroga is actually a native plant that existed on the banks of Ribeirão forest, currently Ribeirão Queiroga, from which the name is derived. There were nomadic Indians, the Botocudos (a subdivision of the Aimorés Tribe), in this region.

See also
List of municipalities in Minas Gerais

References

Municipalities in Minas Gerais